Bistrica, from Proto-Slavic *bystrъ 'quickly flowing, rushing', may refer to:

Places

Albania
Bistricë, Albania, a settlement in Vlorë County

Bosnia and Herzegovina
 Bistrica (Banja Luka)
 Bistrica (Gradiška)
 Bistrica (Fojnica)
 Bistrica (Gornji Vakuf)
 Bistrica (Jajce)
 Bistrica (Zenica)
 Bistrica, Žepče

Croatia
Bistrica, Croatia, a village in eastern Croatia
Marija Bistrica, a town and Marian shrine
Zlatar-Bistrica, a town in western Croatia

Kosovo
Bistrica, Leposavić, a village in Leposavić municipality

Montenegro
Bistrica, Mojkovac, a village in Mojkovac municipality
Bistrice, Podgorica

North Macedonia
Bistrica, Bitola, a village in Bitola municipality
Bistrica, Čaška, a village in Čaška Municipality

Romania
Bistrița, a city in Bistrița-Năsăud County, in northern Transylvania

Serbia
Bistrica (Crna Trava), a village
Bistrica (Lazarevac), a village
Bistrica (Leskovac), a village
Bistrica (Nova Varoš), a village
Bistrica (Novi Sad), a quarter of the city of Novi Sad
Bistrica (Petrovac), a village in the Petrovac na Mlavi municipality, Braničevo District

Slovenia
Bistrica, Črnomelj, a settlement in the Municipality of Črnomelj
Bistrica, Litija, a settlement in the Municipality of Litija
Bistrica, Naklo, a settlement in the Municipality of Naklo
Bistrica ob Sotli, a settlement in the Municipality of Bistrica ob Sotli
Bistrica pri Tržiču, a settlement in the Municipality of Tržič
Bistrica, Šentrupert, a settlement in the Municipality of Šentrupert
Bohinjska Bistrica,  a settlement in the Municipality of Bohinj
Ilirska Bistrica, a town in the Municipality of Ilirska Bistrica
Kamniška Bistrica, a settlement, a valley, and a river  
Slovenska Bistrica, a town the Municipality of Slovenska Bistrica

Rivers

Albania
Bistricë (river), a river between Delvinë and Sarandë in southwestern Albania

Bosnia and Herzegovina
, a river in Federation of Bosnia and Herzegovina, tributary of Vrbas
Bistrica (Drina), a river near Foča in Eastern Bosnia, tributary of Drina
Bistrica (Livanjsko Polje), a river near Livno in Western Bosnia

Greece
Haliacmon (Bistrica), longest river in Greece

Kosovo
, tributary of Ibar
Dečani Bistrica, a river in western Kosovo, tributary of the White Drin
Peć Bistrica, a river in southwestern Kosovo, tributary of the White Drin
Prizren Bistrica, a river in northern Kosovo, tributary of the White Drin
Kožnjar Bistrica, see Dečani Bistrica
, tributary of Erenik, see Dečani Bistrica

Montenegro
, 2 tributaries of the Zeta and Lim river in Montenegro

Romania
Bistrița (Someș), a river in the Romanian region of Transylvania

Serbia
Bistrica (Nišava), a river in southeastern Serbia, tributary of the Nišava
, a river in southeastern Serbia, tributary of the Vlasina
Bistrica (South Morava), a river in southeastern Serbia, tributary of the South Morava

Slovenia
Kamnik Bistrica, an Alpine river in northern Slovenia, tributary of the Sava
Triglav Bistrica, an Alpine river in Upper Carniola, tributary of the Sava Dolinka
Tržič Bistrica, a river in Upper Carniola, tributary of the Sava

See also 
Bistrica (disambiguation), in Slovene, Croat, Serb and Macedonian
Bistritsa (disambiguation) (Бистрица), in Bulgarian
Bistritz (disambiguation), in German
Bistriţa (disambiguation), in Romanian
Bystrica (disambiguation), in Slovak
Bystrzyca (disambiguation), in Polish
Feistritz (disambiguation), in German
Bystřice (disambiguation), in Czech